Hubert Ralph John Rhys (31 August 1897 – 18 March 1970) was a Welsh cricketer.  Rhys was a right-handed batsman.  He was born at Aberdare, Glamorgan, and was educated at Shrewsbury School.

Rhys made his first-class debut for the Free Foresters against Cambridge University in 1929, making a century on debut with a score of 149 in the Free Foresters first-innings.  This would be the only time he would make a century in his brief first-class career.  In that same season he made his first-class debut for Glamorgan in the County Championship against Leicestershire at Ynysangharad Park, Pontypridd.  He made a further appearance in that season against Surrey.  In the following season, Rhys made five first-class appearances for Glamorgan, the last of which came against Sussex, which was also his final match for the county.  Rhys made a total of seven first-class appearances for Glamorgan, scoring 147 runs at an average of 12.25, with a high score of 35.  In that same season he also made two further first-class appearances: one for the Free Foresters against Cambridge University, in which he recorded his only first-class half century with a score of 73, while another appearance came for Wales against the Marylebone Cricket Club.  Rhys later appeared in a single Minor Counties Championship match for Monmouthshire against Berkshire in 1934.

He died at Llandaff, Glamorgan, on 18 March 1970.

References

External links
Hubert Rhys at ESPNcricinfo
Hubert Rhys at CricketArchive

1897 births
1970 deaths
Sportspeople from Aberdare
People educated at Shrewsbury School
Welsh cricketers
Free Foresters cricketers
Glamorgan cricketers
Wales cricketers
Monmouthshire cricketers